The Delta 31, also called the Albin Delta, is a Swedish sailboat that was designed by Peter Norlin as a cruiser-racer and first built in 1983.

The Delta 31 was designed as a replacement for the Ballad 30 in the company's product line.

Production
The design was built by Albin Marine in Sweden from 1983 to 1986, with 300 boats completed, but it is now out of production.

Design
The Delta 31 is a recreational keelboat, built predominantly of fibreglass, with wood trim. It has a fractional sloop rig, a raked stem, a reverse transom, an internally mounted spade-type rudder controlled by a tiller and a fixed fin keel. It displaces  and carries  of ballast.

The design has sleeping accommodation for six people, with a double "V"-berth in the bow cabin, an "U"-shaped settee and a quarter berth in the main cabin and an aft cabin with a double berth on the starboard side. The galley is located on the port side just forward of the companionway ladder. The galley is equipped with a two-burner stove and a round sink. A navigation station is aft of the galley, on the port side. The head is located just aft of the bow cabin on the starboard side.

Operational history
In a 2009 review Yachting Monthly described the design as, "a sleek, powerful, fractionally rigged cruiser-racer".

See also
List of sailing boat types

References

External links
Photo of a Delta 31
Sailing the Delta 31 video

Keelboats
1980s sailboat type designs
Sailing yachts
Sailboat type designs by Peter Norlin
Sailboat types built by Albin Marine